Route 287 is a 42 km two-lane north/south highway on the south shore of the Saint Lawrence River in the Bas-Saint-Laurent region of Eastern Quebec, Canada. Its northern terminus is in Saint-Denis-De La Bouteillerie at the junction of Route 132 and the southern terminus is at Lac de l'Est, part of the municipality of Mont-Carmel. About 10 km after Mont-Carmel, the route becomes a gravel road until the lake.

List of towns along Route 287

 Saint-Denis-De La Bouteillerie
 Saint-Philippe-de-Neri
 Mont-Carmel

See also
 List of Quebec provincial highways

References

External links  
 Provincial Route Map (Courtesy of the Quebec Ministry of Transportation) 
 Route 287 on Google Maps

287